Guilty as Sin is the thirteenth studio album by the British heavy metal band Girlschool, released November 13, 2015. Guilty as Sin is the band's first album of original material since 2008's Legacy, after re-recording their 1981 album Hit and Run in 2011. It is the final release to feature original co-lead vocalist and bassist Enid Williams as Williams left the band in 2019.

Track listing

Personnel
Band
 Kim McAuliffe - vocals, rhythm guitar, and backing vocals
 Jackie Chambers - lead guitar, backing vocals
 Enid Williams - bass guitar, vocals, and backing vocals
 Denise Dufort - drums

Production
 Chris Tsangarides - producer, engineer, mixing
 Tim Hamill - additional mixing, mastering
 Jack Joseph - photography
 Sing Lo - photography
 Karl - photography
 Zak Wilson - cover art, design

References

2015 albums
Girlschool albums
Albums produced by Chris Tsangarides